Rosara Joseph (born 21 February 1982 in Christchurch) is a New Zealand cyclist who won a silver medal for New Zealand in the Women's mountain bike racing event at the 2006 Melbourne Commonwealth Games. She is also the current Oceania champion, a Rhodes Scholar at St John's College, Oxford, and a lawyer.

Cycling
In training for the 2006 Commonwealth games, in 2005 she finished 16th in the World Cross Country Mountainbiking Championships in Italy
Silver Medal for New Zealand in the Women's Mountain bike racing event at the 2006 Melbourne Commonwealth Games.
She finished ninth in the 2008 Beijing Olympic Games in the women's cross country race.

Education and prizes
 2000 – Brooker's Prize in Legal System
 2002 – Duncan Cotterill Award in Law
 2003 – Minter Ellison Rudd Watts Prize in Law
 2003 – Russell McVeagh Prize for Excellence in Intellectual Property
 2005 – Bachelor of Laws with First Class Honours, Canterbury
 2005 – Gold Medal in Law
 2005 – Inaugural Gerald Orchard Prize in Law for excellence in the Law of Evidence
 2005 – Bachelor of Arts in History
 2006 – Commenced Bachelor of Civil Law ("a highly-esteemed master’s-level qualification") at Oxford
 2011 – DPhil at Oxford University

Legal career
Clerk for the President of the NZ Court of Appeal in Wellington. (Justice Anderson and Justice Glazebrook)
Legal and policy consultant, New Zealand Productivity Commission, 2012–

References

Rosara Joseph, Graduate and Student Profiles, University of Canterbury, Christchurch, NZ

External links 
 Full text of doctoral thesis, "The war prerogative: history, reform and constitutional design" via Oxford Research Archive

1982 births
Living people
New Zealand mountain bikers
Cross-country mountain bikers
Olympic cyclists of New Zealand
Cyclists at the 2008 Summer Olympics
Commonwealth Games silver medallists for New Zealand
Cyclists at the 2006 Commonwealth Games
New Zealand Rhodes Scholars
Alumni of St John's College, Oxford
Cyclists from Christchurch
Commonwealth Games medallists in cycling
21st-century New Zealand people
Medallists at the 2006 Commonwealth Games